Bash at the Brewery is a series of professional wrestling special live events which are produced by Impact Wrestling and River City Wrestling for Impact Wrestling's video-on-demand service Impact Plus, airing exclusively on Impact Plus.

Events

References

Impact Wrestling shows
Recurring events established in 2019
Professional wrestling in San Antonio